Towson Town Center is a large indoor shopping mall located in Towson, Maryland. It was the largest indoor shopping mall in Maryland prior to the completion of Arundel Mills in late 2000 in Hanover and the 2007 expansion of Westfield Annapolis.

History
Towson Plaza was an open-air mall built in 1952 on ground originally sold by Goucher College. Towson Plaza was built next to the Towson location of Hutzler's which has since closed and been redeveloped. Towson Plaza was one of the earliest multi-level shopping centers. Much of that original structure remains incorporated into the current mall as its two lower levels. The mall was enclosed in 1973, and renovated in 1982 with the opening of Hecht's across the parking lot. Lawrence Rachuba and the DeChiaro group were the developers.

Over the years, stores and attractions were added on to increase traffic in the mall and make it more competitive with other malls in the area. One memorable effort was Gadgets restaurant and arcade. It was a Warner Bros. themed restaurant with animatronic characters performing periodic shows on stage, which opened and closed in the early 1980s. Some of the original stores survived this era but later closed, including Hess Shoes, Loewmeyer's, and Friendly's. The Level 1 center court featured The Garden Cafe and a dandelion fountain at its entrance. The glass elevator was installed between the old escalators. During the 1991 renovation, the fountain was replaced with a smaller one. In 1999, the popular theme restaurant, Rainforest Cafe opened in the mall and was a tenant for the next ten years, closing in January 2009. Bistro Sensations took the place of Garden Cafe in 2000 and has since gone out of business.

The third and fourth floors were developed by The Hahn Company, later TrizecHahn, and opened in October 1991. It included the addition of the Arbor Terrace food court on Level 3. New fountains were added to the Nordstrom court and third floor courts along with a glass elevator connecting Levels 3 and 4. The upper floors sit above a parking garage while access to the lower levels form a downhill pattern, as much of the mall property was built on a slope. The 2007 expansion described below expanded the older first and second floors toward Dulaney Valley Road. The mall was sold to The Rouse Company in 1998 years before it was acquired by General Growth Properties. All GGP properties were transferred to Brookfield Properties in 2018.

Stores
At opposite ends of the mall are two department stores, Macy's (formerly Hecht's) and Nordstrom. The three-story Macy's connects to the mall's top two floors, while Nordstrom connects to all four mall floors (including Nordstrom Rack on the first floor).

Current tenants

Nordstrom (since 1991)
Macy’s (Since 2006)

Former tenant
Hecht’s (closed 2006)

Crime
A large parking garage is connected directly to the mall structure. A popular area high school teacher was murdered on one of the garage's upper levels in 2005, leading some to worry that the crime in inner-city Baltimore was gaining a stronger foothold in the suburbs. After the murder, several reports of mugging as well as muggers with guns led to several security upgrades with many firsts in mall security. 
On December 19, 2011, a man was shot and killed outside a service entrance to Nordstrom. Four men were convicted in the gang-related shooting. On April 23, 2012, a man and woman were robbed at gunpoint by 3 men in one of mall's parking garages. The robbers remain at large.

On January 24, 2013, a man stole $35,050 worth of merchandise from the Louis Vuitton store.

A cell phone video in December 2015 showed police at the scene of a disruption at the mall. Teenagers were accused of throwing rocks at police officers. This has resulted in a permanent curfew for residents under the age of 17 from entering the mall after 5:00 P.M. on Fridays and Saturdays without an adult present with them.

Renovations
In 2007, Towson Town Center began a $76 million expansion and renovation project that added to the existing structure, its largest expansion since 1992. The project included renovations to the mall's first and second floors, parking, restaurants, and a "Main Street"-style facade with exterior shopping, which was largely completed in October 2008. The project includes a flagship Crate & Barrel store, P.F. Chang's China Bistro, The Cheesecake Factory, Stoney River Legendary Steaks, and T.G.I. Friday's.

In November 2016, Towson Town Center began a million dollar renovation to its four parking garages. This involved the addition of Park assist technology. A “Park Assist” system alerts customers to available parking spaces through overhead red and green lights. According to owner Brookfield Properties, they also remodeled mall entrances, enclosed bridges from parking decks to the center, enhanced lighting and updated signage, adding 1,600 standardized signs, including at all major entrances.

Location
Towson Town Center is located at the intersection of York Road, Dulaney Valley Road, and Joppa Road and is also bordered in the north by Fairmount Avenue. It can be accessed from the Baltimore Beltway by taking exit 27 and heading south.

The mall is close to Goucher College, Towson University, and the Towson branch of the Baltimore County library.

Public bus service to the mall is available on bus routes 36, 51, 52, 93, CityLink Green, and CityLink Red operated by the Maryland Transit Administration. The Collegetown Network, a joint venture of many higher-education institutions in and around Baltimore, also operates a shuttle service that transports many students to and from the mall.

The Towson Square development, with restaurants and a movie theater, is across Joppa Rd. The Prospect Hill Cemetery is across from Macy's on Dulaney Valley Rd.

Parking
Towson Town Center has four 7-story parking garages, which are color coded. The A garage is orange, B is red, C is blue, and D is green. The mall has a total of 4400 parking spaces.

References

External links

1959 establishments in Maryland
Baltimore County, Maryland landmarks
Buildings and structures in Baltimore County, Maryland
Shopping malls established in 1959
Brookfield Properties
Shopping malls in Maryland
Tourist attractions in Baltimore County, Maryland
Towson, Maryland